Nymphargus posadae is a species of frog in the family Centrolenidae, formerly placed in Cochranella.
It inhabits the eastern slopes of the Andes of Colombia, Ecuador, and northeastern Peru. It is reasonably common in Colombia but rare in Ecuador.

Description
The dorsum is green with small
greenish-white warts. Webbing is very reduced between the fingers and moderate between the toes.

Habitat
The natural habitats of Nymphargus posadae are vegetation alongside streams in sub-Andean and Andean forests. They lay their eggs on leaves over-hanging water. When the eggs hatch, the tadpoles drop into the water below where they develop further. A permanent source of water is required for reproduction. This species is threatened by habitat loss caused by agricultural expansion, timber extraction, and water pollution.

References

posadae
Amphibians of the Andes
Amphibians of Colombia
Amphibians of Ecuador
Amphibians of Peru
Taxonomy articles created by Polbot
Amphibians described in 1995